The 1986–87 season was Colchester United's 45th season in their history and sixth consecutive season in fourth tier of English football, the Fourth Division. Alongside competing in the Fourth Division, the club also participated in the FA Cup, the League Cup and the Associate Members' Cup.

The play-offs were introduced in 1987 for clubs finishing in fourth, fifth and sixth positions. United ended the campaign in fifth place, ten points adrift of automatic promotion. They faced fourth placed Wolverhampton Wanderers in the semi-final, but were eliminated following a 2–0 defeat in the first leg and a 0–0 draw at Molineux Stadium in the second leg.

Colchester were eliminated from the FA Cup by eventual play-off winners Aldershot in the second round, and were defeated by Peterborough United and Gillingham respectively in the League Cup and Associate Members' Cup.

Season overview
Mike Walker was appointed as permanent manager after finishing the previous campaign in a caretaker capacity.

Early in the season, Perry Groves was sold to Arsenal for £50,000, but despite this Colchester were bookmakers favourites heading into the new term. Seven successive away defeats from December denied the U's this opportunity as they came home in fifth position, ten points shy of promoted Essex rivals Southend United. However, with the introduction of the play-offs in 1987, Colchester had an opportunity to achieve promotion. They faced fourth-placed Wolverhampton Wanderers at a rain-soaked Layer Road in their semi-final first leg tie in front of a near-capacity 4,829. The visitors came away with a 2–0 victory, and a 0–0 draw at Molineux Stadium in the second leg meant Colchester would remain in the Fourth Division for at least another year.

Colchester did not fare well in cup competition once again, with an early exit in the League Cup to Peterborough United in the first round. They needed a replay against non-League Bishop's Stortford in the FA Cup to reach the second round, but were defeated 3–2 at Aldershot in the second round. The U's progressed from the preliminary round of the Associate Members' Cup to face Gillingham in the southern section first round, but were beaten 2–0 at Priestfield Stadium.

Players

Transfers

In

 Total spending:  ~ £20,000

Out

 Total incoming:  ~ £50,000

Loans in

Match details

Fourth Division

Results round by round

League table

Matches

Football League play-offs

League Cup

FA Cup

Associate Members' Cup

Squad statistics

Appearances and goals

|-
!colspan="16"|Players who appeared for Colchester who left during the season

|}

Goalscorers

Disciplinary record

Clean sheets
Number of games goalkeepers kept a clean sheet.

Player debuts
Players making their first-team Colchester United debut in a fully competitive match.

See also
List of Colchester United F.C. seasons

References

General
Books

Websites

Specific

1986-87
English football clubs 1986–87 season
1986–87 Football League Fourth Division by team